The Blackjacks were a professional wrestling tag team. The team consisted of Blackjack Mulligan and Blackjack Lanza. After forming in the 1970s, they wrestled in a variety of professional wrestling promotions, including the American Wrestling Association (AWA) and World Wide Wrestling Federation (WWWF). They were inducted into the WWE Hall of Fame in 2006.

History

The original Blackjacks
The duo first joined forces in 1971. They were managed by Bobby Heenan.

The Blackjacks won multiple tag team titles, including the WWA Tag Team Championship and two tag-team championships in WCCW. They, however, are most known for winning the WWWF Tag Team Championship (with Lou Albano as their manager) on August 26, 1975 by defeating Dominic DeNucci and Pat Barrett.

After their tenure in the WWWF they disbanded and went their separate ways. They would reunite in 1983 working in St. Louis and AWA until disbanding in 1984. Lanza retired from wrestling in 1985 and became a road agent for WWF (WWWF). Mulligan returned to the WWF, Florida and Texas until his retirement in 1989.   

On April 1, 2006, The Blackjacks were inducted into the WWE Hall of Fame by Heenan.

Mulligan died on April 4, 2016 from heart failure and other health issues at 74 years old.

Lanza had died on December 8, 2021. He was 86 years old, and had reportedly been in poor health.

The New Blackjacks
In early 1997, Mulligan's son, Barry Windham, and Justin "Hawk" Bradshaw formed The New Blackjacks in the WWF. They were known as Blackjack Windham and Blackjack Bradshaw, who originally competed as heels, but later as babyfaces it was rumored in early 1997 that they would be bodyguards for The Undertaker (for his WWF World Heavyweight Championship run in 1997). They competed in a four-way tag team match at WrestleMania 13, which was won by The Headbangers. They would then feud with The Godwinns. The team never reached the success of their predecessors and disbanded in January 1998, as Windham turned on Bradshaw.

Championships and accomplishments
Big Time Wrestling
NWA American Tag Team Championship (2 times)
NWA Texas Tag Team Championship (1 Time)
Professional Wrestling Hall of Fame
Class of 2016
World Wrestling Association
WWA World Tag Team Championship (1 time) 
World Wide Wrestling Federation / World Wrestling Entertainment
WWE Hall of Fame (Class of 2006)
WWWF World Tag Team Championship (1 time)

See also
The Acolytes Protection Agency
The Four Horsemen
The Heenan Family
The U.S. Express
The West Texas Rednecks

References

Further reading

External links
WWE Hall of Fame Profile of The Blackjacks

American Wrestling Association teams and stables
Professional Wrestling Hall of Fame and Museum
The Heenan Family members
WWE Hall of Fame inductees
WWE Hall of Fame team inductees
WWE teams and stables
WWE World Tag Team Champions